The bamboo lemurs or gentle lemurs are the lemurs in genus Hapalemur. These medium-sized primates live exclusively on Madagascar.

Etymology
Bamboo lemurs were first described by French zoologist Isidore Geoffroy Saint-Hilaire in 1851. Comparing their small size, proportions, speckled fur, and other traits to those of marmosets—then classified in the genus Hapale—he named the genus Hapalemur. Hapale derives from the Greek word ἁπαλός (hapalos), meaning "gentle".

In their discussion of lemur name etymologies, Dunkel et al. speculated that the once popular vernacular name for the genus, "gentle lemur", derived from the translation of Hapalemur, despite their notoriety for being one of the most aggressive lemurs in captivity—an observation first noted in a letter by Dutch naturalist François Pollen published in 1895. More recently, the common name "bamboo lemur"  first appeared in the mid- to late-1980s following the rediscovery of the greater bamboo lemur (Hapalemur simus). However, the name became more generally used a year or two later following the discovery of the golden bamboo lemur (Hapalemur aureus) in 1987. For a few years, both names or combinations of both were widely used, but "bamboo lemur" became the preferred name in 1994 with the publication of the first edition of Lemurs of Madagascar. The term "gentle lemur" has seen little use in both popular and academic literature since the early 2000s.

Description 

The bamboo lemurs are characterized by a grey-brown fur, which varies by species. Their muzzles are short and their ears are round and hairy. Lengths vary from 26 to 46 cm (10.2 to 18.1 inches), with tails just as long or longer, and they weigh up to 2.5 kg (5.5 pounds.)

Bamboo lemurs prefer damp forests where bamboo grows. Although they can be active any time of the day, they are often active just after dawn. Though primarily arboreal, they sometimes come down to the ground. The Lac Alaotra gentle lemur or "bandro" (Hapalemur alaotrensis), which lives in the reed beds of Lac Alaotra, spends much of its time in water and can swim well, unlike other lemur species, which only venture to water to drink.

The lesser gentle lemurs live together in groups of three to five animals, which probably represent families composed of a male, one or two females, and their offspring. They communicate with a variety of sounds.

Gestation lasts 135 to 150 days and ends between September and January, when the female bears one to two young. These are weaned after about four months (if the food supply is ample) and are fully mature at two years of age. Their life expectancy is up to 12 years.

Cyanide Consumption 
Not all bamboo contain cyanide, but H. aureus selects the growing tips of Cephalostachyum viguieri, which contain 15 mg of cyanide per . Other bamboo lemurs have been found to consume less cyanogenetic forms of bamboo, such as mature shoots of C. viguieri or the leaves of Cephalostachyum perrieri.  How certain bamboo lemurs can detoxify the high amounts of cyanide in their diets is unknown.

Classification 
As of 2010, the classification of bamboo lemurs lists five species and three subspecies. The greater bamboo lemur was removed from this genus in 2001 to Prolemur but was restored in 2016.

 Genus Hapalemur
 Eastern lesser bamboo lemur, H. griseus 
 Eastern lesser bamboo lemur, H. g. griseus
 Gilbert's bamboo lemur, H. g. gilberti
 Ranomafana bamboo lemur, H. g. ranomafanensis
 Southern lesser bamboo lemur, H. meridionalis
 Western lesser bamboo lemur, H. occidentalis
 Lac Alaotra bamboo lemur, H. alaotrensis
 Golden bamboo lemur, H. aureus
 Greater bamboo lemur, H. simus

References

External links

 Primate Info Net Hapalemur Factsheets
 Conservation of the Alaotra Gentle Lemur - by Madagascar Wildlife Conservation